Heath Rugby Club is an English rugby union club based in Greetland, near Halifax, West Yorkshire. The first XV team plays in Regional 1 North East, having been promoted into tier five following the league restructuring at the end of the 2021-22 season. This was the club's second promotion in three seasons, after finishing runners-up in two consecutive seasons in Yorkshire 1, obtaining promotion as the best ranked runner-up. The club has made its way up the leagues over the history of league rugby having started league life in Yorkshire 3.

Honours
Yorkshire 3 champions: 2001–02, 2005–06

References

Official website
http://www.heath-rugby.co.uk

English rugby union teams
Sport in Halifax, West Yorkshire
Sport in West Yorkshire